Subhash Bridge is a bridge over Sabarmati River, built in 1973. It is an important area in Ahmedabad for its association with Mahatma Gandhi. Gandhi Ashram is 1.5 km away from Subhash Bridge. Gandhi Ashram Shopping area is a storehouse of Khadi. Subhash Bridge stands as a residential area of Ahmedabad with more than 80 residential societies spread across this place. It has been separated from rest of the city by a railway line in the west and Sabarmati river at its eastern side.

In August 2019, Subhash bridge went under major repairs after 50 years and hence, was made to close it till eight Sundays.

Accessibility
 7 km from City Railway Station.
 About 16 km from Airport.
 Ashram Road and Dr. Chinubhai Patel Road are major connecting roads here.

Areas Under Subhash Bridge
 Keshavanagar

References 

Neighbourhoods in Ahmedabad
Bridges in Ahmedabad
Bridges completed in 1973
1973 establishments in Gujarat
20th-century architecture in India